Blair Road (Ottawa Road #27) is a road in the eastern part of Ottawa, Ontario, Canada. It begins just south of the Rockcliffe Parkway, but does not connect to the parkway, except for a small bike-path connection to the Ottawa River Pathway - one of the city's main bike trails that runs along the Ottawa River.

Starting out quite minor, the northernmost part of the road is a two-lane collector road (north of Montreal Road) or minor arterial road (south of Montreal Road), running past residential areas and to the east of the massive National Research Council and Canadian Security Intelligence Service campuses. This section was known as Skead Road before being joined to the southern section in the early 1970s.

It becomes much larger on the south side of Ogilvie Road and Regional Road 174, where it becomes one of the major north-south routes in eastern Ottawa. It is also home to Blair station, the main transit terminal for east-central Ottawa. Blair is also one of the 13 stations on the east-west, light rail Confederation Line of the O-Train, travelling through the downtown core and ending at Tunney's Pasture station. South of the Queensway it runs to the west of the Pineview Municipal Golf Club until it abruptly ends at Innes Road.

Communities along Blair Road:
Pineview
Beacon Hill South
Beacon Hill North

References

External links

Google Maps: Blair Road

Roads in Ottawa